Mbekezeli Mabuza (born 6 January 1985) is a Zimbabwean cricketer.

Mabuza has played domestic cricket in Zimbabwe for the Bulawayo-based Matabeleland, Westerns and Matabeleland Tuskers, and has also represented Zimbabwe A. Mabuza made his First class debut for Matabeleland on 19 March 2004 in a Logan Cup match against Manicaland. He played his first List A match for Matabeleland on 9 November 2004 against Mashonaland, and his first Twenty20 match on 19 March 2008 for Westerns against Easterns.

In April 2009, Mabuza scored his maiden First class century for Westerns in a Logan Cup defeat against Easterns. In May 2009, he took a match-winning 5-wicket haul for Westerns in the final of Zimbabwe's domestic Twenty20 competition against Northerns.

Mabuza and fellow Westerns player Simba Kusano were involved in a car crash in August 2009. Mabuza suffered a back injury, while Kusano suffered a broken leg and did not play any further top level cricket.

In October 2010, Mabuza starred with both bat and ball in a MetBank Pro40 Championship victory for the Tuskers against the Southern Rocks. He scored an unbeaten 46, sharing a century partnership with English wicket-keeper Adam Wheater, before bowling the final over to deny the Southern Rocks victory.

References

External links
 

1985 births
Living people
Zimbabwean cricketers
Matabeleland cricketers
Sportspeople from Bulawayo